The VDMA (Machinery and Equipment Manufacturers Association) represents about 3,500 German and European companies of the mechanical engineering industry. The industry stands for innovation, export orientation and medium-sized businesses. The companies employ around four million people in Europe, more than one million of them in Germany. Mechanical and plant engineering represents a European turnover volume of around 748 billion euros (2021). With a net value added of around 270 billion euros, it contributes the highest share of the entire manufacturing sector to the European gross domestic product. Turnover of mechanical engineering in Germany is EUR 221,3 billion (2021), German machinery production is valued at EUR 216,0 billion (2021) and the export rate of Germany's mechanical and plant engineering sector is 82 percent; 2021).

The association was founded in 1892.

Core topics 
VDMA concentrates its efforts on eight key topics:

Markets and economy – VDMA provides its members with country-specific and economic data, which they can then use as a planning basis for their business decisions.

Research and production – VDMA provides its member companies with a network, where new trends and technologies in production can be discussed so that they can forge new paths as part of Industrielle Gemeinschaftsforschung (industrial collective research, IGF). One of many examples here is Industrie 4.0.

Energy and environment – VDMA essentially supports the German federal government's energy and climate protection goals and promotes an ambitious implementation of the European Union's Energy Efficiency Directive. German mechanical and plant engineering makes an important contribution to this by providing and using energy efficient technologies. VDMA combines the topic areas of technology, research and energy policy in various formats such as the VDMA Forum Energy, where VDMA pools the energy policy-related activities of the associations and the sector's expertise on energy. The Forum Energy also acts as a voice for the investment goods industry and represents the interests of mechanical and plant engineering towards policymakers and the public.

Social and economic policy – Mechanical and plant engineering is the largest industrial employer in Germany, with more than one million employees. VDMA's core activities therefore include analysis, commenting and discussion of social and economic policy issues. The Association publishes its joint positions on economic policies regarding the following topics on an annual basis: labor market and wage policy, foreign trade policy, education policy, securing a skilled workforce, energy policy, Europe policy, research policy, social security, tax policy, technology policy, environmental policy and a sustainable state.

Profession and training – VDMA is involved in activities relating to apprenticeships, degree programs and professional qualifications. VDMA's Education department is the main contact in this field.

Companies and management – strategic positioning, operative management, human resource development, corporate social responsibility and many others. Against this backdrop, the Management Services department at VDMA is the first point of contact regarding management issues; its consultants are available to all member companies and obliged to maintain confidentiality.

Law and taxes - VDMA's team of economic lawyers specialized in the investment goods industry work on the topics of law and taxes.

Standardization and technology policy 
Standardization and technology policy facilitate technological and economical collaboration on a national, European and international level. VDMA supports the competitiveness of mechanical engineering via the DIN Standards Committee Mechanical Engineering (NAM). Furthermore, the Standardization department coordinates activities regarding the creation of VDMA Specifications – the standardization process for mechanical engineering.

Campaigns 
Campaigns highlight VDMA's activities and focus on topics that are particularly important from VDMA's point of view.
 
"Arbeit 4.0" – Everything remains different
Industrie 4.0 will not only make economic processes and production process more efficient, but also help to change the world of work. Mechanical and plant engineering plays an important role here as both a provider and a user of Industrie 4.0 technologies. 
www.allesbleibt-anders.net

Blue Competence – The sustainability platform 
The mechanical and plant engineering industry shows that sustainability increases profitability. This realization also holds true for other sectors and other parts of the world. The idea behind Blue Competence is to show that sustainable business can be a great help to both customers and producers in mechanical engineering.

"Talentmaschine" – The mechanical engineering portal for the next generation 
VDMA uses the online portal Talentmaschine.de to reach out to school and university students who are interested in technology and looking for an apprenticeship, internship or traineeship. The portal offers a nationwide overview of job listings in mechanical engineering, and gives the around 3,200 VDMA members a handy tool that helps them find new talent.

"Maschinenhaus" – The VDMA initiative for student success
Increasing student success in mechanical engineering and electrical engineering at all German universities is an important objective for VDMA. The aim is to lower high drop-out rates and help make more engineers available on the labor market.

"Wir unternehmen was" – CSR is an important topic in mechanical engineering 
Many mechanical engineering companies in Germany not only develop sustainable products and processes, but also make a contribution to society with great commitment and responsibility. This commitment is as varied as the companies themselves.

Organization 
VDMA is a registered association based in Frankfurt am Main, Germany, and comprises six regional subsidiaries, seven representative offices in foreign countries and 37 trade associations. VDMA was founded in 1892 and celebrated its 125-year anniversary in 2017.
The strategic positioning and operative leadership of VDMA are the responsibility of the Executive Directorate. The Association is headed by a Board of Chairmen comprising three elected company representatives. The President is elected every three years and cannot be re-elected. A Restricted Board and a Main Board with company representatives from mechanical and plant engineering act as advisory committees for the Board of Chairmen. 
 
VDMA Board of Chairmen:
	Karl Haeusgen, President of VDMA, HAWE Hydraulik SE, Munich
	Henrik Schunk, Vice-President of VDMA, Schunk GmbH & Co. KG, Lauffen
	Bertram Kawlath, Vice-President of VDMA, Schubert & Salzer, Ingolstadt

VDMA Executive Directorate
	Thilo Brodtmann, executive director of VDMA
	Hartmut Rauen, deputy executive director of VDMA
	Dr. Ralph Wiechers, Member of Executive Directorate of VDMA

History 
The Verein deutscher Maschinenbau-Anstalten (VDMA) was founded in Cologne in 1892 with the objective of protecting the economic interests of all German mechanical engineering companies. It has its origin in the Verein Rheinisch-Westfälischer Maschinenbauanstalten, which was founded two years earlier and aimed to improve delivery and price conditions for mining and plant machinery in particular. Its first office was in Düsseldorf. Several trade associations joined VDMA over the years that followed, one of them being the Verein Deutscher Werkzeugmaschinenfabriken (German Machine Tool Builders’ Association, VDW), which joined in 1916. In 1918, VDMA moved from Düsseldorf to Berlin.

In 1934, a year after the Nazis seized power, the new government adopted the “Gesetz zur Vorbereitung des organischen Aufbaus der deutschen Wirtschaft” (Law detailing the organic construction of the German economy). As part of this process, all business associations were united under one central management system and answerable to the Reich's Minister of Economic Affairs. VDMA became part of the newly founded the Wirtschaftsgruppe Maschinenbau (mechanical engineering economic group), membership of which was also compulsory for all companies that had not previously been part of an association. This group was led by Karl Lange, the executive director of VDMA.

At the end of the war, the Wirtschaftsvereinigung Maschinenbau (business association for mechanical engineering, WVMA) was founded. A year later, the Verein Bayerischer Maschinenbau-Anstalten (association of Bavarian mechanical engineering institutes, VBMA), the Wirtschaftsvereinigung der Maschinenbau-Anstalten in Groß-Hessen (business association for mechanical engineering institutes in Greater Hesse, WVMH) and the Wirtschaftsverband Maschinenbau in Berlin (business association for mechanical engineering in Berlin) were founded. The Arbeitsgemeinschaft der Verbände der Deutscher Maschinenbau-Anstalten (working group of the associations of German mechanical engineering institutes, AVDMA) was the first supra-regional association to be founded, in 1947. In 1949, the Mechanical Engineering Industry Association (VDMA) was re-established in Königstein im Taunus.

Shortly after that – in 1950 – VDMA established a liaison office in the German capital, Bonn. A year later, the Gesellschaft zur Förderung des Maschinen- und Anlagenbaus mbH (society for the promotion of mechanical and plant engineering, GzF) and the Maschinenbau Verlag GmbH (later VDMA Verlag) were founded. In 1954, VDMA took part in founding the Europe Liaison Group of the European Mechanical, Electrical, Electronic and Metalworking Industries (Orgalime) in Brussels, Belgium.

In 1966, VDMA's headquarters moved to Niederrad, a district of Frankfurt. A number of sub-organizations were founded over the following years: Forschungskuratorium Maschinenbau e.V. (research association for the mechanical engineering industry, FKM) in 1968, Dokumentation Maschinenbau e.V. (DOMA) and the Deutsche Maschinenbau-Institut (German mechanical engineering institute, DMI) now Maschinenbau-Institut GmbH (MBI) in 1972, the Fachinformationszentrum Technik (technology information center) in 1979.

During the next few years, political contacts were established and intensified on a national and international scale. VDMA established a liaison office in Brussels in 1972; another followed in Tokyo in 1984. In 1980, the Association changed its German name from Verein Deutscher Maschinenbau-Anstalten to Verband Deutscher Maschinen- und Anlagenbau. The abbreviation, VDMA, remained the same. VDMA's Impuls Foundation was founded in 1992, followed by VDMA Gesellschaft für Forschung und Innovation mbH (society for research and innovation, VFI) in 1998. That same year, VDMA's Berlin office was inaugurated.

Presidents  
Verein Deutscher Maschinenbau-Anstalten
 1892–1893 Hugo Jacobi, GHH, Sterkrade
 1893–1910 Heinrich Lueg, Haniel & Lueg, Düsseldorf
 1910–1915 Ernst Klein, Maschinenbau AG, vorm. Gebr. Klein, Dahlbruch
 1915–1920 Kurt Sorge, Krupp Gruson, Magdeburg
 1920–1923 Ernst Borsig, A. Borsig, Berlin
 1923–1934 Wolfgang Reuter, Demag, Duisburg

Wirtschaftsgruppe Maschinenbau
 1934–1945 Otto Sack, Rud. Sack, Leipzig

Wirtschaftsverband Maschinenbau Düsseldorf
 1946–1949 Gerhard Wolff, Alexanderwerk, Remscheid

Wirtschaftsvereinigung Maschinenbau in Hessen
 1946–1949 Alfred Mößner, Diskus-Werke, Frankfurt am Main

Vereinigung der Maschinenbau-Anstalten von Württemberg-Baden
 1946–1949 Emil Möhrlin, E. Möhrlin, Stuttgart

Verein Bayerischer Maschinenbau-Anstalten e.V.
 1946–1949 Everhard Bungartz, Bungartz, München

Verein Deutscher Maschinenbau-Anstalten e.V.
 1949–1959 Gustav Möllenberg, Westfalia Dinnendahl Gröppel, Bochum
 1959–1962 Max Knorr, Fortuna-Werke, Stuttgart
 1962–1965 Bernhard Weiss, Siemag, Siegen
 1965–1968 Walter Reiners, Schlafhorst, Mönchengladbach
 1968–1971 Heinz zur Nieden, Ankerwerke, Bielefeld
 1971–1974 Hugo Rupf, Voith, Heidenheim
 1975–1977 Kurt Werner, Goebel, Darmstadt

Verband Deutscher Maschinen- und Anlagenbau e.V.
 1978–1981 Bernhard Kapp, Kapp, Coburg
 1981–1983 Tyll Necker, Hako, Bad Oldesloe
 1984–1986 Otto H. Schiele, KSB, Frankenthal
 1987–1989 Frank Paetzold, Schlafhorst, Mönchengladbach
 1990–1992 Berthold Leibinger, Trumpf, Ditzingen
 1993–1995 Jan Kleinewefers, Kleinewefers, Krefeld
 1995–1998 Michael Rogowski, Voith, Heidenheim
 1998–2001 Eberhard Reuther, Körber, Hamburg
 2001–2004 Diether Klingelnberg, Klingelnberg, Hückeswagen
 2004–2007 Dieter Brucklacher, Leitz, Oberkochen
 2007–2010 Manfred Wittenstein, Wittenstein AG, Igersheim
 2010–2013 Thomas Lindner, Groz-Beckert KG, Albstadt
 2013-2016 Reinhold Festge, Haver & Boecker OHG, Oelde
 2016 - 2020 Carl Martin Welcker, Alfred H. Schuette GmbH & Co. KG
 since 2020 Karl Haeusgen, HAWE Hydraulik

References

External links
 

Engineering societies based in Germany
Trade associations based in Germany